An octave is a verse form consisting of eight lines of iambic pentameter (in English) or of hendecasyllables (in Italian).  The most common rhyme scheme for an octave is ABBA ABBA.

An octave is the first part of a Petrarchan sonnet, which ends with a contrasting sestet.  In traditional Italian sonnets the octave always ends with a conclusion of one idea, giving way to another idea in the sestet.  Some English sonnets break that rule, often to striking effect.  In Milton's Sonnet 19, the sestet begins early, halfway through the last line of the octave:

See also
Sicilian octave
Ottava rima

References

External links
Poetic Form: Sonnet - Poets.org

Stanzaic form
Sonnet studies
Western medieval lyric forms

ru:Октава (литература)